Tim Duncan (born June 12, 1979) is a former American football placekicker who played in the National Football League (NFL) for the Arizona Cardinals.  He played college football at the University of Oklahoma. Duncan also played for Kentucky State University in the Division II SIAC conference during the 1997 season when he helped the Thoroughbreds win the inaugural Pioneer Bowl. He transferred to Oklahoma the following season.

Duncan was the starting placekicker for Oklahoma's 2000 BCS National Championship team.

NFL career
Duncan played two seasons for the Arizona Cardinals backing up starter Bill Gramatica. Due to Gramatica's inconsistency and injury problems, this made it a necessity for the team to keep two kickers.

He appeared in five games in 2003, making 6 out of 10 field goals and 5 out of 6 extra points, with his longest field goal being a 53-yarder. He was released on November 10, 2003.

On March 30, 2004, Duncan signed a two-year contract with the Philadelphia Eagles, only to be released August 30. He would later work out with the Tennessee Titans, but wasn't offered a contract.

After a year out of football, Duncan signed with the Oakland Raiders on January 24, 2006. He was soon relocated to NFL Europa, where he played for the Cologne Centurions. The Raiders released him August 29.

References

External links
 KFFL Profile

1979 births
Living people
American football placekickers
Arizona Cardinals players
Cologne Centurions (NFL Europe) players
Kentucky State Thorobreds football players
Oakland Raiders players
Oklahoma Sooners football players
Philadelphia Eagles players
Sportspeople from Tulsa, Oklahoma
Players of American football from Oklahoma